CentrePort/DFW Airport station is a Trinity Railway Express (TRE) commuter rail station in Fort Worth, Texas. It is located on Statler Boulevard just south of Dallas/Fort Worth International Airport. It opened on September 16, 2000, and is a station on the TRE commuter line, serving the CentrePort business park and DFW Airport.

Connections 
From the station, Trinity Metro operates several shuttle services. 

Route 30, the CentrePort Circulator, connects passengers with businesses in the area around the station. The route operates with three loops: the West Loop (which primarily serves the headquarters of American Airlines), the Amon Carter Loop and the East Loop. Route 30 only operates weekday during the peak commuting periods.

Route 31, the TRE Link, matches the operating frequency of trains and runs between the station and DFW Airport Terminal B station where passengers can connect with the TEXRail line, the DART Orange Line and all DFW Terminals using the DFW Skylink system.

From April 2013 to December 2017, the Metro Arlington Xpress shuttle connected the station to downtown Arlington, including the University of Texas at Arlington campus. The service has since been replaced by a ride-sharing service operated by Via.

References

External links
 
 TRE - CentrePort/DFW Airport Station
 DFW Airport - TRE Ground Transportation

Trinity Railway Express stations
Railway stations in the United States opened in 2000
Airport railway stations in the United States
Dallas Area Rapid Transit commuter rail stations
Dallas/Fort Worth International Airport
Railway stations in Tarrant County, Texas
Railway stations in Fort Worth, Texas
2000 establishments in Texas